A bacon roll is either:
 a bacon wrapped food comprising a roll made of bacon with various fillings inside it
 a bacon sandwich comprising a roll sandwiching bacon inside it

See also